SS Pierre L'Enfant was a Liberty ship built in the United States during World War II. She was named after Pierre L'Enfant, a French-American military engineer who designed the basic plan for Washington, D.C., known today as the L'Enfant Plan.

Construction
 Pierre L'Enfant was laid down on 17 May 1943, under a Maritime Commission (MARCOM) contract, MCE hull 1001, by the Bethlehem-Fairfield Shipyard, Baltimore, Maryland; she was sponsored by Mrs. O. M. White, the wife of a yard employee, and was launched on 11 June 1943.

History
She was allocated to Polarus Steamship Co., Inc., on 28 June 1943. On 27 November 1946, she was sold for commercial use to Atlantic Maritime Co., for $544,506. After several owner and name changes, sailing as Kolasin, she was grounded near Tuapse, on the Black Sea, and declared a Total Loss.

References

Bibliography

 
 
 
 

 

Liberty ships
Ships built in Baltimore
1943 ships
Maritime incidents in 1970